Orestis Laskos (11 November 1907 – 17 October 1992) was a Greek film director, screenwriter and actor. He directed 55 films between 1931 and 1971. He also wrote scripts for 24 films between 1929 and 1971.

Family
He was married to actress Beata Asimakopoulou (died 2009); they had at least one child, a son, Vassilis Laskos.

Selected filmography
 Dafnis kai Chloe (1931)
 Madame X (1954)
 Allos ... gia to hekatommyrio! (1964)

External links
 
 Account of Orestis Laskos

1907 births
1992 deaths
People from Elefsina
Greek male film actors
Greek film directors
Greek screenwriters
20th-century Greek male actors
20th-century screenwriters
Greek male silent film actors